Diana A. Wind (Peterborough, 22 October 1957) is a Dutch art historian. For nearly two decades she was the director of the Stedelijk Museum Schiedam (1995–2016), that was comprehensively renovated under her management. She is also author of the book 'All About Drawing. 100 Dutch artists', that is seen as a leading work on contemporary Dutch drawing.

Biography 

Wind studied art history, economics and marketing at the Vrije Universiteit Amsterdam. During her studies she already worked in the Communications division of the Stedelijk Museum Amsterdam (1987–1989). Subsequently, she became Head of Marketing at the Department of Art & Culture in Groningen.

In 1995 Wind became director of the Stedelijk Museum Schiedam (1995–2016). During this time she was responsible for the renovation and privatisation of the museum. In 2011 Wind was awarded the distinction Knight of the order of Orange-Nassau for her efforts for the museum and her many public functions.

Selected exhibitions 

 1997. De Gouden Eeuw van Schiedam, 1598 – 1795. Stedelijk Museum Schiedam
 2007. Lucebert. Schilder, Dichter, Fotograaf. Stedelijk Museum Schiedam. Also shown in Museum Danubiana, Bratislava.
 2008. Verloren Paradijs. Monumentaal Tekenen. Stedelijk Museum Schiedam
 2009. Virtuoze Zinsbegoochelingen. Stedelijk Museum Schiedam
 2011. All About Drawing. 100 Nederlandse tekenaars. Stedelijk Museum Schiedam, together with Arno Kramer
 2016. Ritme & Regelmaat: 70 jaar abstractie in de kunst, 1945 – 2015. Gallerie Witteveen

References

Living people
1957 births
Dutch art historians
Women art historians
Vrije Universiteit Amsterdam alumni
Knights of the Order of Orange-Nassau